Godby Shipping AB is a Finnish shipping firm, based in Mariehamn in Åland. It was established in 1973, and as of 2021 its CEO is Dan Mikkola. The company specialises in RO-RO vessels and mainly serves the Forestry and Pulp & Paper sector.

History

Founding 
The company was founded by Captain Alpo Mikkola in 1973. Alpo Mikkola, Bror Husell, Kaino Virta and Matti Kankare bought the salvaged cargo vessel Heike Bos for SEK 175,000 on 15 September 1972. The ship was repaired in Mariehamn and Turku. The ship reentered service in winter 1973 after being renamed Miniland. The original partners other than Mikkola left and were replaced by new investors Torsten Törnroth, Sigvard Åkerberg and Ingmar Törnroth. 

Soon after the vessels Luna and Mini Star were bought, operated briefly and onsold. The company initially operated in short term charters and then began to specialize in longer term charters to companies associated with the Forestry Industry and Pulp & Paper.

Fleet

Former Fleet

Gallery

References

External links
Official site

Shipping companies of Finland
Transport companies established in 1973
1973 establishments in Finland
Mariehamn
Companies of Åland